Lyon Lake is a small, natural lake in Fredonia Township, Calhoun County, Michigan. The other lakes are Fish Lake, Pine Lake and Long Lake.

Lyon Lake is surrounded by predominantly modest residential homes that are the primary residences of the homeowners. The southern shore of the lake is adjacent to the Marshall Country Club, which is a  private golf course.

Lyon Lake is named after Lucius Lyon, who was a prominent land surveyor in the Michigan Territory in the early 1830s and among the most influential men in the process of establishing statehood. Lucius Lyon served Michigan as both U.S. Senator and U.S. House Representative.

See also
List of lakes in Michigan

References

External links
 Lucius Lyon
 Marshall Country Club, Marshall, Michigan

Bodies of water of Calhoun County, Michigan
Lakes of Michigan